The Coreana Cosmetic Museum (also known as Coreana Museum of Art or Coreana Art & Culture Complex) is a museum in Seoul, South Korea.

It is related to the Korean Coreana cosmetics company. Its collection is based on 53,000 items collected by Dr. Yu Sang-Ok, one of the executive directors of Coreana.

The Coreana Cosmetics Museum opened in 2003 with the collection of Yu Sangok, the founder and chairman of Coreana Cosmetics. Yu commissioned Chung Gu-Yon, a well known ecological architect to design this museum. Yu wanted to create a space that would feel like a garden in the middle of the city. 
This museum's main focus is in Korean cosmetics and in Korean beauty (K-beauty) culture. This is where viewers will find the root of K-beauty. As the Hallyu wave brings in more clients from all over the world, K-beauty has grown to be a global selling point. Even with this new popularity, K-beauty still remains true to its Korean culture. As visitors enter the museum, the first thing that is presented to them is a display dedicated to natural ingredients and materials women used for makeup, pre-modern day. The museum has different sections for different parts of the face which include what types of materials and natural ingredients they used. There is also a section just for fragrance. In traditional Korean society, fragrance was used to remove body odor, repel harmful insects, and to relax the body and mind. Small pouches of fragrance were worn as accessories or kept in wardrobes to preserve the smell as long as possible. 
The museum also showcases a variety of cosmetics containers because natural ingredients spoil easily. Porcelain containers were the most common because, unlike metals, porcelain has a porous surface that lets air through, which then extends the shelf life of the cosmetics.
During the Goryeo Dynasty (918-1392), the practice of makeup started to thrive among the Korean society. This is also when cosmetics containers and bronze mirrors were produced with intricate designs. The concept of natural beauty became more visible during the Joseon Dynasty (1392-1910), as people tried to present themselves in a modestly graceful look. With the help of today's technology, the knowledge and efficient usage of natural ingredients combined with traditional cosmetics, K-beauty eventually evolved to what it is today. An example of this can be found in the museum. There, viewers will learn that “pre-modern Korean women would use ground grains, such as mung beans, soy beans and red beans, to wash their faces.” 
The museum has programs for different age groups, in both Korean and foreign languages, where museum visitors can try making traditional cosmetics, smell traditional fragrances, or produce their own DIY cosmetics.

See also
Cosmetics in Korea
List of museums in South Korea

References

External links

Museums in Seoul
Fashion museums